Senator English may refer to:

J. Kalani English (fl. 2000s–2010s), Hawaii State Senate
James E. English (1812–1890), U.S. Senator from Connecticut
Jane English (politician) (born 1940), Arkansas State Senate
Karan English (born 1949), Arizona State Senate
Warren B. English (1840–1913), California State Senate